Charles Perrot may refer to:

 Charles Perrot (minister) (1541–1608), Reformed minister who served in Geneva
 Charles Perrot (politician) (1642–1686), Member of Parliament for Oxford University
 Charles Perrot (priest) (1929–2013), Roman Catholic priest and theologian

See also
Charles Perrat, French palaeographer
Charles Parrot, American comedian and filmmaker